"Like Water" is a 2011 single by New Zealand singer-songwriter/rapper Ladi6. The song originally appeared on her album The Liberation Of... and was subsequently released as a single in March 2011.

It peaked at number 9 on the NZ Top 40 Singles Chart and spent 22 weeks in the top 40. It was ranked at number 23 on the 2011 year-end chart. 

"Like Water" was nominated for Single of the Year and director Faye McNeil was nominated for its music video at the 2011 New Zealand Music Awards.

Charts

Weekly charts

Year-end charts

References

External links 
 Music video for Like Water, directed by Faye McNeil

2011 singles